Ərəblər (also, Arablyar) is a village in the Davachi Rayon of Azerbaijan.  The village forms part of the municipality of Pirəmsən.

References 

Populated places in Shabran District